Free Inquiry is a bimonthly journal of secular humanist opinion and commentary published by the Council for Secular Humanism, a program of the Center for Inquiry. Philosopher Paul Kurtz was the editor-in-chief from its inception in 1980 until stepping down in 2010.  Kurtz was succeeded by Tom Flynn who worked as Editor in Chief until 2021. Paul Fidalgo was named editor in 2022, beginning with the October/November issue. Feature articles cover a wide range of topics from a freethinking perspective.  Common themes are separation of church and state, science and religion, dissemination of freethought, and applied philosophy. Regular contributors include well-known scholars in the fields of science and philosophy.

Controversy
In Free Inquiry's April–May 2006 issue, the magazine published four of the cartoons that had originally appeared in the Danish newspaper Jyllands-Posten and that had sparked violent worldwide Muslim protests. Kurtz, editor-in-chief of Free Inquiry said, "What is at stake is the precious right of freedom of expression". The Borders Group refused to carry this issue in their Borders and Waldenbooks stores because of the cartoons. The reason given by Borders for their decision was not sensitivity to religion but fear of violence.

The story made national and international news and the implications of this self-censorship were widely discussed, including by CBS News, The Washington Post, and  The New York Times.  The "blogosphere" widely condemned the decision of Borders to ban the magazine and columnist Christopher Hitchens lamented the action in an article.

Columnists
Regular columnists include:
 Ophelia Benson – Author and blogger
 Russell Blackford – Author and philosopher
 Greta Christina   – Author and blogger
 Shadia Drury – Professor of Philosophy and Political Science
 Tibor Machan – Professor of Philosophy
 Mark Rubinstein – Economist
 Faisal Saeed Al Mutar – Commentator and social critic

Editorial Board

 Editor in Chief: Paul Kurtz (until May 2010)
 Editor: Paul Fidalgo 
 Managing Editor: Nicole Scott
 Assistant Editor: Julia Lavarnway
 Senior Editors: Bill Cooke, Richard Dawkins, Ed Doerr (deceased), James Haught, Jim Herrick, Ronald A. Lindsay, Taslima Nasrin

References

External links
 
 Dogma Free America podcast interview with Tom Flynn, editor of Free Inquiry

Bimonthly magazines published in the United States
Political magazines published in the United States
Freethought in the United States
Magazines established in 1980
Secular humanism
Scientific skepticism mass media
Magazines published in New York (state)
Atheism publications